Plan B was a Puerto Rican reggaeton duo, consisting of Chencho and Maldy, who are co-working cousins. In 2002 they rose to fame and released their first studio album, El Mundo del Plan B. It featured collaborations with Daddy Yankee, Speedy, Rey Pirin, Great Kilo, Guelo Star, and other artists and producers. Chencho and now Maldy are both producers, Chencho has his own record label by the name plagio of Chencho Records, Maldy has his, Maldy Records. They released their second album in 2005 called Los Nenes Del Blin Blin. Maldy's album, released in 2007, was named Reggaeton de Markesina. The duo released their third album in 2010 called House of Pleasure and released singles from the album such as "Si No Le Contesto" and "Es un Secreto". Finally, the duo released their fourth and final album in 2014 called Love and Sex and worked with artists like Alexis & Fido, J Álvarez, Tego Calderón, Zion & Lennox, Clandestino y Yailemm, and Amaro.

Discography

Studio albums 
 2002: El Mundo del Plan B
 2010: House of Pleasure
 2014: Love & Sex

Compilation 
 2005: El Draft 2005
 2007: Reggaeton de Markesina

Mixtapes 
 2005: Los Nenes del Blin Blin
 2006: La Trayectoria
 2007: Reggaeton de Markesina
 2007: House of Pleasure: The Mixtape 2007
 2007: Interstate 69: The Road to Pleasure (Hosted by DJ Sin-Cero)
 2010: Live in Concert Tampa FL
 2010: House of Pleasure: The Mixtape 2010

Collaboration albums 
 2005: El Draft 2005
 2012: Plan B Society Presents: El Draft World Edition
 2012: La Fórmula

Charting singles

Awards and nominations

Latin Grammy Awards 

!Ref.
|-
|align="center"|2016
|"A Donde Voy" (Cosculluela featuring Daddy Yankee)
|Best Urban Song
|
|align="center"|
|}

Billboard Latin Music Awards 

!Ref.
|-
|align="center" rowspan="2"|2016
|rowspan="2"|Plan B
|Latin Rhythm Songs Artist of the Year, Duo or Group
|
|align="center" rowspan="2"|
|-
|Latin Rhythm Albums Artist of the Year, Duo or Group
|
|}

Notes

References

External links 
 
 
 
 
 

Puerto Rican musical duos
Puerto Rican reggaeton musicians
Reggaeton duos